Nikolaikirche is a 1995 German television film directed by Frank Beyer and based on the 1995 book by Erich Loest. The film concentrates on the last years of East Germany and tells the story of a family that is torn between the protest movement and the Stasi. The name of the film derives from the Nikolaikirche in Leipzig, which was the starting point for the Monday demonstrations. The film was produced in two different versions. A longer, two part television version and a shorter theatrical version.

External links
 
 Nikolaikirche at the Goethe-Institut

1995 films
1995 television films
German television films
Films directed by Frank Beyer
1990s German-language films
German-language television shows
Das Erste original programming
Works about the Stasi
Television shows based on German novels
Films based on German novels
Films set in Leipzig
Films shot in Berlin